Stefan Langwieder (born January 8, 1987) is a German professional ice hockey defender who currently plays for the Iserlohn Roosters of the Deutsche Eishockey Liga.  He initially played for Adler Mannheim during the 2007 season before signing with the Iserlohn Roosters in 2008. On April 5, 2009, Langwieder was signed to a three-year extension to remain with Iserlohn.

Career statistics

Regular season and playoffs

International

References

External links

1987 births
German ice hockey defencemen
Living people
Adler Mannheim players
Iserlohn Roosters players
Portland Winterhawks players
Sportspeople from Munich